Bentleyville may refer to:

Bentleyville, Ohio, U.S.A.
Bentleyville, Pennsylvania, U.S.A.